Michael Paton was a Scottish footballer of the 1880s.

Career
Paton played for Dumbarton and Scotland.

Honours
Dumbarton
- Scottish Cup: Winners 1882–83 - Runners Up 1880–81;1881–82
- Dumbartonshire Cup: Winners 1884–85
- Glasgow Charity Cup: Runners Up 1881–82;1884–85
- 5 caps for Scotland between 1882 and 1886
- 1 representative cap for Dumbartonshire
- 1 representative cap for Scotch Counties
- 2 international trial matches for Scotland between 1883 and 1885.

See also
List of Scotland national football team captains

References

External links

London Hearts profile
Michael Paton (Dumbarton Football Club Historical Archive)

Year of birth missing
Scottish footballers
Scotland international footballers
Dumbarton F.C. players
Year of death missing
Association football fullbacks